Stanley Atwood "Daddy" Boles (July 25, 1887 – December 4, 1961) was an American football and basketball coach and college athletics administrator. He was the athletic director at the University of Kentucky from 1917 through 1933. He also served as head coach of the Kentucky Wildcats football and Kentucky Wildcats men's basketball teams for one season each. He was responsible for hiring legendary men's basketball coach Adolph Rupp at Kentucky.

Biography
Boles was born on July 25, 1887 in Williamstown, Kentucky. He graduated from Kentucky Wesleyan College, earned a master's degree from Vanderbilt University in 1911, and also studied at the University of Virginia.

Boles served as the head football coach at Polytechnic College—now known as Texas Wesleyan University—in Fort Worth, Texas for one season, in 1913, leading his team to a record of 2–2–4. Boles was the head football coach at Texas Christian University (TCU) in 1914 and then at Trinity University in Waxahachie, Texas in 1915.

In 1916, Boles was hired by the University of Kentucky to assist athletic director John J. Tigert with coaching. His brother, Ewing T. Boles, was a noted businessman and philanthropist.

Head coaching record

Football

Basketball

References

External links
 basketball stats at BigBlueHistory.com
 

1887 births
1961 deaths
Kentucky Wildcats athletic directors
Kentucky Wildcats football coaches
Kentucky Wildcats men's basketball coaches
TCU Horned Frogs football coaches
Texas Wesleyan Rams football coaches
Trinity Tigers athletic directors
Trinity Tigers football coaches
College golf coaches in the United States
Kentucky Wesleyan College alumni
Vanderbilt University alumni
People from Williamstown, Kentucky
Sportspeople from the Cincinnati metropolitan area
Coaches of American football from Kentucky
Basketball coaches from Kentucky